Route 299 is a  long two-lane highway which cuts through the Appalachian Mountains in Quebec, Canada. It starts at the junction of Route 132 in Cascapédia–Saint-Jules, runs through Gaspésie National Park and ends at the junction of Route 132 in Sainte-Anne-des-Monts. It is an isolated highway with only a few small settlements along the way.

Municipalities along Route 299

 Cascapédia–Saint-Jules
 Rivière-Bonaventure
 Lac-Casault
 Mont-Albert
 Sainte-Anne-des-Monts

Major intersections

See also
 List of Quebec provincial highways

References

External links 
 Provincial Route Map (Courtesy of the Quebec Ministry of Transportation) 
 Route 299 on Google Maps

299